Leslie "Les" Collinson (born 2 December 1935) is an English former professional footballer who played as a half-back in the Football League for Hull City and York City, in non-League football for Goole Town, Hull Brunswick and Chilton Amateurs.

References

1935 births
Living people
Footballers from Kingston upon Hull
English footballers
Association football midfielders
Hull City A.F.C. players
York City F.C. players
Goole Town F.C. players
Hull Brunswick F.C. players
English Football League players